A garden fork, spading fork, or digging fork is a gardening implement, with a handle and a square-shouldered head featuring several (usually four) short, sturdy tines.  It is used for loosening, lifting and turning over soil in gardening and farming, and not to be confused with the pitchfork, a similar tined tool used for moving (or throwing) loose materials such as hay, straw, silage, and manure.

A garden fork is used similarly to a spade in loosening and turning over soil.  Its tines allow it to be pushed more easily into the ground, and it can rake out stones and weeds and break up clods, it is not so easily stopped by stones, and it does not cut through weed roots or root-crops. Garden forks were originally made of wood, but the majority are now made of forged carbon steel or stainless steel.

Reflecting their differing uses, garden forks have shorter, flatter, thicker, and more closely spaced tines than pitchforks. They have comparatively a fairly short, stout, usually wooden handle, typically with a "D" or "T" shaped grab at the end. 

A smaller version of such forks with shorter, closer-spaced, thinner tines (but a full-sized handle) is known as a border fork or ladies' fork, and is used for lighter work, such as weeding amongst other plants. Forks with broader, flatter tines are made for lifting potatoes and other root crops from the ground. A pair of forks back-to-back may used to lever apart dense clumps of roots.

See also
Broadfork — for breaking up hardpan
Fork
Garden tool
Pitchfork — for lifting loose material such as hay
Spade

References
 (trans. from Zeitschrift des Vereines Deutscher Ingenieure, 19 Mar 1921)

Gardening tools